Federal Way High School is a public high school located in Federal Way, Washington. It was originally built in 1938. A new campus opened in the fall of 2016.

Academics
 Advanced Placement courses: Calculus, Statistics, and Photography.
 Pre-AP: Classes in English, History of the Pacific Region, World History, Science, and Biology for 9th and 10th graders.
 AVID: (Advancement Via Individual Determination) a college-preparatory class focusing on goal-orientation and organizational skills.
 American Sign Language
 Band (symphonic, concert, orchestra, jazz)
 Cambridge Program courses: Calculus, Biology, Physics, Chemistry, Graphic Design, English, U.S History, Economics, International Relations, Photography, Spanish, French.
 Choir (concert, jazz, and chamber)
 Sports Medicine/Athletic Training
 Drama
 Journalism/yearbook
 Air Force Junior ROTC
 Introduction to Supernatural Phenomenon
 Creative Writing
 Leadership & ASB
 Photography/Pottery/Art
 University of Washington classes in College Writing, French 5/6, and Spanish 5/6. Students can earn 5 credits for each of these classes.
 Newsweek ranks Federal Way High School 442 on its 2010 list of the United States' 1623 best public high schools
 Marketing - Zero hour student store and 4th period student store
 Computer Science
 Personal Finance, Business Law and Digital Communications Tools
 Woodworking - Beginning and Advanced cabinetry classes.
 Culinary - basics to cooking

Activities
Book Club, Cambridge Academy, Cheer Team, Chess Club, Dance Team, DECA/Student Store, Family, Career and Community Leaders of America, French Club, Future Business Leaders of America, Gamers Club, Gay/Straight Alliance, Habitat for Humanity, National Honor Society, Key Club, Latino Club, Letter Club, Native American Club, Pacific Islander Club, Peer mediators, Poetry Club, Pride/UNITEE, Reach Club, robotics,  Speech/Debate Team, and Powerful Women's Club.

Athletics
Federal Way is in the Olympic Division of the North Puget Sound League in Washington's West Central District.
The most recent successes include Boys' Basketball 4A State Championships back-to-back in 2014 and 2015 (29-0), and back-to-back State Track Titles for both boys and girls in 2013 and 2014. Boys' Baseball took a first-place finish in 2001 and second-place finishes in 2000, '02 and '03, and a third-place finish in 2010 in the 4A State tournament. In 2002, the boys' basketball team qualified for the State tournament, the first time since 1994. This was the start in a renewed interest and success for the basketball team.

In the 2007-2008 basketball season, Federal Way finished second in the 4A State tournament, their highest finish in school history until 2014. In 2006, FWHS left the South Division of the South Puget Sound League (SPSL) and joined the North SPSL. Also in the 2007 season, the Boys' Soccer Team achieved second place in the state. Both the 2008-2009 Federal Way boys' and girls' basketball teams made the 4A Washington State Basketball tournament. The girls' team went on to finish in third while the Boys finished in first place after a 62-54 win over Garfield High School.

The 2009-2010 Federal Way boys' and girls' basketball teams both made the 4A Washington State Basketball tournament again.  The boys finished 3rd. Also for the 2010 Federal Way Boys' Cross country team, they went 8-0 and became SPSL South Champions. Then later on traveled to Pasco, Washington to compete in 4a Washington State Cross Country Championships. The boys later on, finished 13th place. In 1978, the Eagles Volleyball team under Coach Kathy Harris placed 3rd in the State Volleyball Tournament. The Eagles’ only other state tournament appearance came in 1988. In 1997, the Women's basketball team won the 3A state championship. 

In 2016, FWHS joined the resurrected North Puget Sound League's Olympic Division. 

Notable professional athletes from Federal Way High School include: Donny Marshall (NBA), Michael Dickerson (NBA), Jalen McDaniels (NBA), Travis Ishikawa (MLB), Lake Dawson (NFL), and Dan Spillner (MLB).

Notable alumni
 Amber Pacific - Punk Rock Band (class of 2003)
 Shaun Bodiford- NFL player
 Heather Brooke- noted journalist, writer, and freedom of information activist in the United Kingdom.
 Lake Dawson- former NFL player, now a Director of Player Personnel with the NFL's Tennessee Titans.
 Cole Dickerson - current professional basketball player
 Michael Dickerson- former NBA player
 Travis Ishikawa- former MLB player, won 2 World Series titles with the San Francisco Giants. 
 John Moe- Author, radio and podcast host.
 Dan Spillner- former MLB player (San Diego Padres, Cleveland Indians, Chicago White Sox)
 Donny Marshall- former NBA player, 2x Sports Emmy winner and current NBA/NCAA basketball analyst for FOX Sports
 Kyle Secor- American television and movie actor
 Ross Shafer- comedian and television host turned motivational speaker
 Kelyn Rowe- Major League Soccer New England Revolution
 Charlie Taumoepeau- NFL player
 Jalen McDaniels- NBA player, currently plays for the Charlotte Hornets
 Jaden McDaniels- NBA player, currently plays for Minnesota Timberwolves
 Tari Eason - NBA player, currently plays for Houston Rockets

References

External links
 
 Federal Way High School School Profile

High schools in King County, Washington
South Puget Sound League
Educational institutions established in 1938
Federal Way, Washington
Public high schools in Washington (state)
1938 establishments in Washington (state)